Lisa Bertini (born 22 February 1972) is an Italian rower. She competed in the women's lightweight double sculls event at the 1996 Summer Olympics. Her brother Lorenzo Bertini is also an Olympic rower.

References

External links
 

1972 births
Living people
Italian female rowers
Olympic rowers of Italy
Rowers at the 1996 Summer Olympics
Sportspeople from Pisa